Zeta (uppercase Ζ, lowercase ζ; , , classical  or  zē̂ta;  zíta) is the sixth letter of the Greek alphabet. In the system of Greek numerals, it has a value of 7. It was derived from the Phoenician letter zayin . Letters that arose from zeta include the Roman Z and Cyrillic З.

Name
Unlike the other Greek letters, this letter did not take its name from the Phoenician letter from which it was derived; it was given a new name on the pattern of beta, eta and theta.

The word zeta is the ancestor of zed, the name of the Latin letter Z in Commonwealth English. Swedish and many Romance languages (such as Italian and Spanish) do not distinguish between the Greek and Roman forms of the letter; "zeta" is used to refer to the Roman letter Z as well as the Greek letter.

Uses

Letter  
The letter ζ represents the voiced alveolar fricative  in Modern Greek.

The sound represented by zeta in Greek before 400 BC is disputed. See Ancient Greek phonology and Pronunciation of Ancient Greek in teaching.

Most handbooks agree on attributing to it the pronunciation  (like Mazda), but some scholars believe that it was an affricate  (like adze). The modern pronunciation was, in all likelihood, established in the Hellenistic age and may have already been a common practice in Classical Attic; for example, it could count as one or two consonants metrically in Attic drama.

Arguments for    
 PIE *zd becomes ζ in Greek (e.g. *sísdō > ). Contra: these words are rare and it is therefore more probable that *zd was absorbed by *dz (< *dj, *gj, *j); further, a change from the cluster /zd/ to the affricate /dz/ is typologically more likely than the other way around (which would violate the sonority hierarchy).
 Persian names with zd and z are transcribed with ζ and σ respectively in Classical Greek (e.g. Artavazda =  ~ Zara(n)ka- = .
 Some inscriptions have -ζ- written for a combination -ς + δ- resulting from separate words, e.g. θεοζοτος for θεος δοτος "god-given".
 Some Attic inscriptions have -σζ- for -σδ- or -ζ-, which is thought to parallel -σστ- for -στ- and  therefore to imply a  pronunciation.
 ν disappears before ζ like before σ(σ), στ: e.g. * > , * > , * > . Contra: ν may have disappeared before /dz/ if one accepts that it had the allophone  in that position like /ts/ had the allophone : cf. Cretan  ~  (Hinge).
 Verbs beginning with ζ have  in the perfect reduplication like the verbs beginning with στ (e.g.  = ). Contra: a) The most prominent example of a verb beginning with στ has in fact  < *se- in the perfect reduplication; b) the words with /ts/ > σ(σ) also have : Homer , Ion. .
 Alcman, Sappho, Alcaeus and Theocritus have σδ for Attic-Ionic ζ. Contra: The tradition would not have invented this special digraph for these poets if  was the normal pronunciation in all Greek. Furthermore, this convention is not found in contemporary inscriptions, and the orthography of the manuscripts and papyri is Alexandrine rather than historical.
 The grammarians Dionysius Thrax and Dionysius of Halicarnassus class ζ with the "double" letters ψ, ξ and analyse it as σ + δ. Contra: The Roman grammarian Verrius Flaccus believed in the opposite sequence, δ + σ (in Velius Longus, De orthogr. 51), and Aristotle says that it was a matter of dispute (Metaph. 993a) (though Aristotle might as well be referring to a  pronunciation). It is even possible that the letter sometimes and for some speakers varied in pronunciation depending upon word position, i.e., like the letter X in English, which is (usually) pronounced [z] initially but [gz] or [ks] elsewhere (cf. Xerxes).
This suggests that different dialects had different pronunciations. (For a similar example in the Slavic languages, cf. Serbo-Croatian (iz)među, Russian между, Polish między, and Czech mezi, "between".)

Arguments for [dz]   
Contra: a few inscriptions do seem to suggest that ζ was pronounced like σδ; furthermore, all words with written σδ are morphologically transparent, and written σδ may simply be echoing the morphology. (Note, for example, that we write "ads" where the morphology is transparent, and "adze" where it is not, even though the pronunciation is the same.)
 It seems improbable that Greek would invent a special symbol for the bisegmental combination , which could be represented by σδ without any problems. , on the other hand, would have the same sequence of plosive and sibilant as the double letters of the Ionic alphabet ψ  and ξ , thereby avoiding a written plosive at the end of a syllable. Furthermore, it is not clear that ζ was pronounced  when it was originally invented. Mycenean Greek had a special symbol to denote some sort of affricate or palatal consonant; ζ may have been invented for this sound, which later developed into . (For a parallel development, note that original palatal Proto-Slavic  developed into  in Old Church Slavonic, with similar developments having led to combinations such as зд and жд being quite common in Russian.)
 Boeotian, Elean, Laconian and Cretan δδ are more easily explained as a direct development from *dz than through an intermediary *zd. Contra: a) the sound development dz > dd is improbable (Mendez Dosuna); b) ν has disappeared before ζ > δδ in Laconian  (Aristoph., Lys. 171, 990) and Boeotian  (Sch. Lond. in Dion. Thrax 493), which suggests that these dialects have had a phase of metathesis (Teodorsson).
 Greek in South Italy has preserved  until modern times.
 Vulgar Latin inscriptions use the Greek letter Z for indigenous affricates (e.g. zeta = diaeta), and the Greek ζ is continued by a Romance affricate in the ending  > Italian. -eggiare, French -oyer.

Summary 
  is attested only in the lyric poetry of the Greek isle of Lesbos and the city-state of Sparta during the Archaic Age and in Bucolic poetry from the Hellenistic Age. Most scholars would take this as an indication that the -pronunciation existed in the dialects of these authors.
 The transcriptions from Persian by Xenophon and testimony by grammarians support the pronunciation  in Classical Attic.
  is attested from c. 350 BC in Attic inscriptions, and was the probable value in Koine.
  or  may have existed in some other dialects in parallel.

Numeral
Zeta has the numerical value 7 rather than 6 because the letter digamma (ϝ, also called 'stigma' as a Greek numeral) was originally in the sixth position in the alphabet.

Mathematics and science  
The uppercase zeta is not used, because it is normally identical to Latin Z. The lower case letter can be used to represent:
The Riemann zeta function in mathematics
The damping ratio of an oscillating system in engineering and physics
The rotational quantity of angular jerk in physics
The effective nuclear charge on an electron in quantum chemistry
The electrokinetic potential in colloidal systems
The lag angle in helicopter blade dynamics
Relative vorticity in the atmosphere and ocean
A number whose discrete values (eigenvalues) are the positive roots of transcendental equations, used in the series solutions for transient one-dimensional conduction equations
The heat flux across or through a plane (industrial materials technology)
The Weierstrass zeta-function
In physical chemistry equilibrium computations (using lower case Zeta (ζ)), the extent of reaction
The height of the surface of a fluid layer

ZETA (fusion reactor) (all uppercase) was an early fusion experiment.

Character encodings

Greek Zeta / Coptic Zata

Mathematical Zeta

These characters are used only as mathematical symbols. Stylized Greek text should be encoded using the normal Greek letters, with markup and formatting to indicate text style.

See also

Z, z - Latin
З, з - Ze (Cyrillic)

References

General references

Hinge, George. “Die Aussprache des griechischen Zeta”, in Die Sprache Alkmans: Textgeschichte und Sprachgeschichte. PhD dissertation. Aarhus: Aarhus University Press, 2001, pp. 212–234 = 
Méndez Dosuna, Julián. “On <Ζ> for <Δ> in Greek dialectal inscriptions”, Die Sprache 35 (1993): 82–114.
Rohlfs, Gerhard. 1962. “Die Aussprache des z (ζ) im Altgriechischen”, Das Altertum 8 (1962): 3–8.
Teodorsson, Sven-Tage. “On the pronunciation of ancient greek zeta”, Lingua 47, no. 4 (April 1979): 323–32.
Teodorsson, Sven-Tage. “The pronunciation of zeta in different Greek dialects”, in Dialectologia Graeca: Actas del II Coloquio internacional de dialectología griega, eds. E. Crespo et al. Madrid: Universidad Autónoma de Madrid, 1993, pp. 305–321.

Greek letters